Jan Noskiewicz (8 October 1890 – 27 August 1963) was a Polish entomologist specialising in Hymenoptera and Strepsiptera.

Noskiewicz was born in Sanok.  He was Professor of Systematic Zoology and Zoogeography at (then) Breslau now Wroclaw University.  He died in Wroclaw.

His collection of 30,000 Aculeata specimens, including holotypes, syntypes and paratypes of is in Museum of Natural History Wroclaw University.

Works
Jan Noskiewicz With G. Poluszynski. 1928. Embryologische Untersuchungen an Strepsipteren. I. Teil: Embryogenesis der Gattung Stylops Kirby. Akad. Umiejetnosci, Cl. des Sci. Math. et Nat., Bul. Internatl. Ser. B (1927): 1093-1227 (1928).

Polish entomologists
1890 births
1963 deaths
20th-century Polish zoologists